The Helix was a bi-monthly teen science magazine published by CSIRO Publishing, as the young-adult bi-monthly magazine of the Double Helix Science Club. The magazine was established in 1986 as the newsletter for the science club. Soon afterwards, it grew into a magazine in its own right. In 1999, a spin-off science magazine for younger readers, called Scientriffic, was created.

The magazine was usually 40 pages long and trimmed to quarto paper size. It typically contained articles about science and mathematics of interest to teens.

The magazine was relaunched in July 2015 as Double Helix, combining both Scientriffic and The Helix into one magazine, starting from Issue 1, with 8 issues per year.

Editors
The final editor-in-chief was Sarah Kellett. Previous editors have included Ross Kingsland, Darren Osborne, Simon Torok, Kath Kovac, Gabrielle Tramby, Maaroof Fakhri and Jasmine Fellows.

References

External links
 

1986 establishments in Australia
Bi-monthly magazines published in Australia
CSIRO
Eight times annually magazines
English-language magazines
Magazines established in 1986
Magazines published in Australia
Mass media in Canberra
Popular science magazines
Science and technology magazines
Teen magazines
Magazines established in 2015